Ramgoolam is a surname. Notable people with the surname include:

Navin Ramgoolam (born 1947), former Prime Minister of Mauritius
Seewoosagur Ramgoolam (1900–1985), former Prime Minister and former Governor General of Mauritius

See also
Sir Seewoosagur Ramgoolam International Airport